Joseph Quincy Adams Jr. (March 23, 1880 – November 10, 1946) was a prominent Shakespeare scholar and the first officially appointed director of the Folger Shakespeare Library in Washington, D.C.

Biography
Adams, a scion of the famous Adams family that produced two American Presidents, John Adams and John Quincy Adams, was born in Greenville, South Carolina, the son of a Rev. Joseph Quincy Adams, a Baptist clergyman, and Mamie Fouchée Adams (née Davis). He received his B.A. degree from Wake Forest College in 1900, and earned an M.A. degree from the same institution in 1901. He continued his education at the University of Chicago (1902–3), and at the University of Berlin (1907). He pursued a teaching career at several institutions, notably at Cornell University, where he also edited the journal Cornell Studies in English (1910–31).

Adams married Helen Banks on January 29, 1931, though she died a short four years later, on September 14, 1935.

Adams was actively involved with the Folger Shakespeare Library from its founding in 1931. He became the Library's acting director in 1934, and its first regularly appointed director in 1936. In Adams' 1932 inaugural speech at the Folger, he called immigration "a menace to the preservation of our long-established English civilization." He also served as the editor of its periodical publications, as well as the general editor of the New Variorum edition of Shakespeare's works (1935–46). He wrote and published a wide range of books and scholarly articles; he was especially noted for his biography of Shakespeare, first published in 1923.  He was also a member of the Literary Society of Washington.

References

Sources

External links
 Timeline of The Folger Shakespeare Library
 Photographs
 
 

1880 births
1946 deaths
Wake Forest University alumni
Shakespearean scholars
Cornell University faculty
University of Chicago alumni
Writers from Greenville, South Carolina
Folger Shakespeare Library